The Charles King House is a historic residence near Philomath, Oregon, United States.

The house was listed on the National Register of Historic Places in 1990.

See also
National Register of Historic Places listings in Benton County, Oregon

References

External links

1870 establishments in Oregon
Gothic Revival architecture in Oregon
Houses completed in 1870
Houses in Benton County, Oregon
Houses on the National Register of Historic Places in Oregon
National Register of Historic Places in Benton County, Oregon